Leptometra is a genus of free-swimming, stemless crinoids.

Characteristics
Members of this genus have no stems but have five pairs of feathery arms arising from a central concave disc. There are a number of long cirri or unbranched appendages on a low, cone-shaped dorsal ossicle, a bone-like structure in the centre of the disc.

Species
The following species are recognised in the World Register of Marine Species:
Leptometra celtica (McAndrew & Barrett, 1857)
Leptometra phalangium (Müller, 1841)

References

Antedonidae